Grafton is a hamlet in the Thames Valley in West Oxfordshire, about  north of Faringdon. It is one of two hamlets in Grafton and Radcot civil parish.

Hamlets in Oxfordshire

West Oxfordshire District